Boyer River 164 is an Indian reserve of the Beaver First Nation in Alberta, located within Mackenzie County. It is 16 kilometers northwest of Fort Vermilion. In the 2016 Canadian Census, it recorded a population of 218 living in 63 of its 67 total private dwellings.

References

Indian reserves in Alberta
Mackenzie County
Dane-zaa